Urmas Lennuk (born 16 October 1971, in Tamsalu) is an Estonian theatre director, playwright and dramaturg.

In 2000 he graduated from Estonian Academy of Music and Theatre' Stage Art Department. 2000–11 he worked at Rakvere Theatre. 2011–13 he worked at Vanemuine Theatre. Since 2017 he is working again at Rakvere Theatre. 2011–14 he was a screenwriter for the television series Õnne 13.

Lennuk is married to actress Liisa Aibel. The couple have a daughter, adopted in May 2008.

Productions of plays 

 Melfi's "Linnubassein" (1998, diploma work, Estonian Puppetry Theatre)
 Koidula's "Säärane Mulk ehk Sada tangu" (1999)
 Williams's "Iguaani öö" (2000)

References

Living people
1971 births
Estonian theatre directors
Estonian dramatists and playwrights
Estonian Academy of Music and Theatre alumni
People from Tapa Parish